Greenogue is a football ground located in Newcastle, South Dublin, Ireland.

Location

Hosts

The field at Greenogue is part of the Westmanstown townland. Peamount United F.C. use Greenogue as their home venue in the Women's National League.

See also
 Stadiums of Ireland

References

Association football venues in the Republic of Ireland
Sports venues in South Dublin (county)